Elachista commoncommelinae is a moth of the family Elachistidae. It is found along the coast of tropical Queensland.

The forewings are black with a bronzy sheen. The hindwings are dark grey.

The larvae feed on Commelina species. They mine the leaves of their host plant.

References

Moths described in 2011
commoncommelinae
Moths of Australia
Taxa named by Lauri Kaila